The 1985 Buffalo Bills season was the franchise's 16th season in the National Football League, and the 26th overall. It was Buffalo's second-consecutive 2–14 season. Head coach Kay Stephenson was fired after an 0–4 start. Defensive coordinator Hank Bullough took over, going 2–10 for the remainder of the season. For the second consecutive season, the Bills went winless on the road.

Season summary 
The Bills' offense was anemic; its 200 points scored is the lowest total in the 1980s, and the lowest total in team history for a sixteen-game schedule. Having concluded that longtime starting quarterback Joe Ferguson's career was over after a spike in interceptions in the early 1980s, the Bills cut him in the offseason. (The assumption would be in error, as Ferguson would sign with the Detroit Lions and play an additional six seasons in the NFL after being released.) Ferguson's replacements, quarterbacks Vince Ferragamo and Bruce Mathison, only produced 9 passing touchdowns all season, while combining for a league-high 31 interceptions. Buffalo scored fewer than ten points in seven of its sixteen games. The team’s point-differential of negative-181 is the third-worst in franchise history.

Offseason

NFL draft 

In 1985, the Bills used the first overall pick in the draft to select All-American defensive end Bruce Smith. Smith would end up going on to dominate throughout the late 1980s and early 1990s. Smith was an 11-time All-Pro selection, two-time NFL Defensive Player of the Year, and logged an NFL-record 200 sacks by the end of his career.

Fourth-round pick Andre Reed, a wide receiver out of Kutztown (PA) State, would go on to be the leading receiver in Buffalo Bills history. When he retired after the 2000 season, Reed's 951 career receptions were third in NFL history behind Jerry Rice and Cris Carter.

Maryland quarterback Frank Reich would become famous for quarterbacking “The Comeback”, a 1993 playoff game in which Buffalo, down 35–3 in the third quarter, would score 35 unanswered points to win 41–38 in overtime. It is the largest deficit overcome to win a game in NFL history.

Reed played more games with the Bills, 221, than any other player. Smith was second with 217 games.

Personnel

Staff

Roster

Regular season

Schedule 

Note: Intra-division opponents are in bold text.

Game summaries

Week 1

Week 3

Week 6

Week 7

Week 8

Week 10

Week 16

Standings

Notes

References

External links 
 1985 Buffalo Bills at Pro-Football-Reference.com

Buffalo Bills seasons
Buffalo Bills
Buffalo Bills